Elections for Ipswich Borough Council were held on 6 May 1999. One third of the council was up for election and the Labour Party kept overall control of the council.

After the election, the composition of the council was:
Labour 37
Conservative 10
Liberal Democrat 1

Election result

Ward Results
Nineteen councillors were elected.

Bixley

References

1999 Ipswich election result

1999 English local elections
1999
20th century in Suffolk